The 2010–11 season of the División de Honor de Futbol Sala was the 22nd season of top-tier futsal in Spain. It was the last season under "División de Honor" name. From 2011–12 season, the top division will be called Primera División.

Teams

Personnel and kits

Stadia and locations

League table 

Gestesa Guadalajara, 3 points deducted 
Source: Liga Nacional de Futbol Sala
Source:

Championship playoffs

Quarter-finals

First leg

Second leg

Third leg

Semi-finals

First leg

Second leg

Final

First leg

Second leg

Third leg

Fourth leg

Fifth and final leg

Relegation playoff 

  Marfil Santa Coloma remained in División de Honor.

Top scorers

See also 
 2010–11 División de Plata de Futsal
 2010–11 Copa del Rey de Futsal
 Futsal in Spain

References

External links 
 2011–12 season at lnfs.es

2010 11
1
futsal
Spain